The 2003 United States Grand Prix (formally the XXXII SAP United States Grand Prix) was a Formula One motor race held on 28 September 2003 at the Indianapolis Motor Speedway, Speedway, Indiana. It was the fifteenth race of the 2003 Formula One season. The 73-lap race was won by Michael Schumacher for the Ferrari team after starting from seventh position. Kimi Räikkönen, who started the Grand Prix from pole position, finished second in a McLaren car, with Heinz-Harald Frentzen third driving for Sauber, in what would be his last podium finish.

The victory was Schumacher's second consecutive win, following the Italian Grand Prix at Monza.

Report

Friday drivers 
The 3 teams in the 2003 Constructors' Championship had the right to drive a third car on Friday that were involved in additional training. These drivers did not compete in qualifying or the race.

Race
Michael Schumacher won the race by 18.258 seconds from pole-sitter Kimi Räikkönen, taking a huge step toward his record-breaking sixth Drivers' Championship as a result. Afterwards, Räikkönen remained in mathematical contention for the championship with one race to go, but Williams driver Juan Pablo Montoya dropped out of the hunt after being penalized for an incident on Lap 3 with Schumacher's Ferrari teammate Rubens Barrichello.

It was the German's first double win since the Ferrari team and its tire supplier Bridgestone accused rival tire maker Michelin of using illegal tires for most of the season, at the Hungarian Grand Prix, threatening to decide the title in court. As a result, Michelin were forced to retool their tires before the Italian Grand Prix, with its teams suffering in the changing weather conditions at Indianapolis.

Though rain clouds surrounded the circuit at the start, all drivers began the race on dry tires. The cars on the "clean" side of the track got off the grid much better, with Räikkönen taking the lead ahead of Olivier Panis and the two Schumachers (all from the left side of the grid) (with drivers including Barrichello, Fernando Alonso, David Coulthard and Montoya dropping back on the right) and managing to open up a lead of 1.6 seconds over Panis's Toyota and Ralf Schumacher's Williams.  On Lap 2, light rain began to fall on parts of the circuit as Räikkönen increased his lead to 2.4 seconds and Panis came under attack from the Williams. Michael Schumacher was up to fourth from seventh on the grid, and Coulthard took fifth place from Barrichello, who was struggling with a malfunctioning gearbox.

Entering Turn 1 on Lap 3 Ralf Schumacher overtook Panis for second place, with Montoya pulling alongside Barrichello on the outside of the 90-degree right-hander to challenge for sixth. As they entered the left-handed Turn 2, Montoya was squeezed onto the curb and then the grass by the Ferrari, and as they began to exit the turn the right front wheel of the Williams touched the Ferrari's sidepod - forcing Barrichello onto the gravel. The Renaults of Fernando Alonso and Jarno Trulli both got around Montoya as he avoided the spinning Barrichello, managing to continue in eighth place with no apparent damage - even setting the fastest time on Lap 8, and by Lap 15 moving up to third on a drying track.

Barrichello later said, "We were running side by side. I thought I had left him enough space, but he touched me and I spun." While Barrichello's car was being removed from the runoff area under a local yellow flag in Turns 1 and 2, Schumacher overtook Panis at the entry to Turn 1 on Lap 5, claiming that he completed the pass before the turn. The stewards agreed, and he was not penalized.

Several drivers tried to anticipate a heavier rainfall by stopping for wet tires very early in the first light shower. Panis, Cristiano da Matta, Jacques Villeneuve and Nicolas Kiesa all stopped on Lap 6 or 7, only to find the track beginning to dry already by Lap 8. Beginning with Villeneuve on Lap 9, they all stopped again within a few laps to change back to dry tires.

However the rain returned during the first round of scheduled pit stops, and when the championship contenders pitted – Montoya on Lap 17, Räikkönen on Lap 19 and Schumacher on Lap 20 – they all chose to stay with dry tires.  On Lap 19, as the rain began to fall more heavily, Montoya was given a drive-through penalty for "causing an avoidable accident" with Barrichello. Montoya rejoined the track during the downpour still on dry tires in eleventh place, effectively ending his championship challenge. "A very disappointing race," he commented afterwards, "basically decided by the penalty I was given for the accident with Rubens and the moment I had to pay it. It is sad to lose my Drivers' Championship chances in this way."

On Lap 28, Button led Frentzen by 5.8 seconds as Schumacher overtook Räikkönen (the top Michelin runner, having already passed Wilson) for third place, then taking second five laps later from Heinz-Harald Frentzen. On Lap 38, having cut 1.5 seconds per lap from Button's lead, Schumacher reclaimed first while the other two Championship contenders, Räikkönen and Montoya, lay fourth and tenth despite the track beginning to dry out once more.

The BAR team's hopes for a podium finish by Button ended on Lap 42 when the Briton's engine failed on the main straight, restoring Frentzen to second place. The Sauber driver himself was overtaken by Räikkönen on Lap 55, before eventually finishing in third (Frentzen's second podium in four years at Indianapolis, and his final Formula One podium). Combined with teammate Nick Heidfeld's fifth place, the Sauber team earned ten points to move past BAR and Jaguar into fifth in the constructor's standings. Jarno Trulli finished fourth for Renault, ahead of Nick Heidfeld, Montoya, Giancarlo Fisichella and Wilson. Schumacher's win also put Ferrari back in front of Williams in the constructor's, with 147 points compared to Williams's 144.

Post-race
The changing conditions saw the Michelin advantage in the dry superseded by Bridgestone dominance in the wet. Michelin motorsport director Pierre Dupasquier said: "Today's race was absolutely fascinating from a technical perspective. We set the early pace, and our drivers were the quickest out there when the circuit dried towards the end. In slightly damp conditions, our grooved dry weather tyres enabled our leading drivers to run up to three seconds per lap faster than Michael Schumacher. In wetter conditions, we were losing two seconds per lap."

According to Räikkönen, who ran with Michelins, "The weather basically lost us the race victory today as we were not as quick in the wet conditions as Michael. I made a good start from pole and was pretty much in control. Once the rain started things changed. We came in at the right times and didn't put a foot wrong but there was nothing we could do."

Classification

Qualifying

Race

Championship standings after the race 
Bold text indicates who still has a mathematical chance of becoming World Champion.

Drivers' Championship standings

Constructors' Championship standings

Note: Only the top five positions are included for both sets of standings.

References

United States Grand Prix
2003
United States Grand Prix, 2003
2003 in sports in Indiana
Grand Prix
Grand Prix